The Madonna della Pietà (1498–1499) informally known as La Pietà is a Roman Catholic  dolorous image of Jesus and Mary at Mount Golgotha representing the “Sixth Sorrow” of the Blessed Virgin Mary and a key work of Italian Renaissance sculpture carved by Michelangelo Buonarroti, now enshrined within Saint Peter's Basilica, Vatican City. It is the first of a number of works of the same subject by the Florentine artist. 

The statue was originally commissioned for a Cardinal of France, Jean Bilhères de Lagraulas, a serving French ambassador in Rome. The  Carrara marble sculpture was made for the cardinal's funeral monument, but was moved to its current location, the first chapel on the north side after the entrance of the basilica, in the 18th century. It is the only piece Michelangelo ever signed.  This interpretation of the Pietà is unprecedented in Italian sculpture because it balances the Renaissance ideals of classical beauty with naturalism.

Pope Urban VIII granted the venerated Marian image a Pontifical decree of canonical coronation via his Papal bull “Domina Coronatum Est” signed and notarized on 14 August 1637 and granted to its patronal donor, Lord Ascanio Sforza y Pallavicini and Canon priest of the Vatican Chapter, Monsignor Ugo Ubaldini. The levitating diadem was manufactured by the Italian artisan, Fantino Taglietti, who charged 564 Italian scudo coins at the time. The official rite of coronation was executed on 31 August 1637.  The cherubic angels were added in 1713 by his descendant, later relocated to the “Chapel of the Holy Choir” within the basilica in 1749.Urbanus VIII, Papam. “Domina Coronatum Est”, signed and notarized on 14 August 1637. Vatican Secret Archives.

The image was significantly vandalized on Pentecost Sunday of 1972 by a mentally disturbed man who infiltrated the unsecured altar at the time.

Description, theories and interpretations

The structure is pyramidal, and the vertex coincides with Mary's head. The statue widens progressively down the drapery of Mary's dress, to the base, the rock of Golgotha. The figures are quite out of proportion, owing to the difficulty of depicting a fully-grown man cradled full-length in a woman's lap. Much of Mary's body is concealed by her monumental drapery, and the relationship of the figures appears quite natural. Michelangelo's interpretation of the Pietà was far different from those previously created by other artists, as he sculpted a young and beautiful Mary rather than a naturally older woman (aged 45) that should be commensurate with the natural age of her son, Jesus (aged 33).

The marks of the Crucifixion are limited to very small nail marks and an indication of the wound in Jesus' side. Accordingly, Christ's face does not reveal signs of the Passion. According to another interpretation, when Michelangelo set out to create his Pietà, he wanted to create a work he described as "the heart's image".

Two drilled holes are located at the top head of the Virgin Mary, which once supported the bar holding two levitating angels, while another hole is located at the tophead of the Christ image.

The Pubescence of Mary

Mary is represented as being very young for the mother of an approximately 33-year-old son, which is not uncommon in depictions of the Passion of Christ at the time. Various explanations have been suggested for this. One is that her youth symbolizes her incorruptible purity, as Michelangelo himself said to his biographer, the fellow compatriot and Roman sculptor Ascanio Condivi:

Another theory suggests that Michelangelo's treatment of the subject was influenced by his passion for Dante's Divine Comedy: so well-acquainted was he with the work that when he went to Bologna, he paid for hospitality by reciting verses from it. In  (Cantica # 33 of the poem), Saint Bernard of Clairvaux in a prayer for the Virgin Mary, says:  ("Virgin mother, daughter of your son"). This is in accordance with the mystical doctrine of the Holy Trinity representing the following archetypes:

 Mary is the Daughter of Triune God the Father
 Mary is also his Mother as she bore the incarnated Christ in flesh
 Mary is also the designated wife and Spouse of the Holy Spirit.

After completion

Following completion, the Pietàs first home was the Chapel of Saint Petronilla, a Roman mausoleum near the south transept of Saint Peter's, which the Cardinal chose as his funerary chapel. The chapel was later demolished by Donato Bramante during his rebuilding of the basilica. 

According to Giorgio Vasari, shortly after the installation of his Pietà, Michelangelo overheard someone remark (or asked visitors about the sculptor) that it was the work of another sculptor, Cristoforo Solari, whereupon Michelangelo signed the sculpture. Michelangelo carved the words on the sash running across Mary's chest.

 (English: "Michelangelo Buonarroti, the Florentine was making this") 

The signature echoes one used by the ancient Greek artists Apelles and Polykleitos. It was the only work he ever signed. Vasari also reports the anecdote that Michelangelo later regretted his outburst of pride and swore never to sign another work of his hands.

Fifty years later, Vasari declared the following regarding the Pietà: 

In 1964, the Pietà was lent by the Vatican to the 1964–1965 New York World's Fair to be installed in the Vatican pavilion. The former Archbishop of New York, Cardinal Francis Spellman formally requested the statue from Pope John XXIII, appointed Edward M. Kinney, Director of Purchasing and Shipping of Catholic Relief Services – USCC, to head up the Vatican Transport Teams.

At the fair, people stood in line for hours to catch a glimpse from a conveyor belt moving past the sculpture. It was returned to the Vatican afterwards.

Restoration (1736)
Subsequent to its carving the Pietà sustained much damage. Four fingers on Mary's left hand, broken during a move, were professionally restored in 1736 by the Roman sculptor Giuseppe Lirioni (1690—1746). Modern scholars today are divided as to whether the restorer took artistic liberties to make the hand gestures more "rhetorical".

Vandalism (1972)

The most substantial damage occurred on 21 May 1972 (Pentecost Sunday), when a mentally disturbed geologist, the Hungarian-born Australian Laszlo Toth, walked into the chapel and attacked the sculpture with a geologist's hammer while shouting, "I am Jesus Christ; I have risen from the dead!" With 15 blows he removed Mary's arm at the elbow, knocked off a chunk of her nose, and chipped one of her eyelids. 

An American national, Bob Cassilly from Saint Louis, Missouri was one of the first people to remove Toth from the Pietà. He recalled the following events:

Onlookers took many of the pieces of marble that flew off. Later, some pieces were returned, but many were not, including Mary's nose, which had to be reconstructed from a block cut out of her back.

After the attack, the work was painstakingly restored and returned to its place within the basilica, just to the right of the entrance, between the holy door and the altar of Saint Sebastian, and is now protected by a bulletproof acrylic glass panel.

See also
 Pietà
 Asteroid 274472 Pietà
 Replicas of Michelangelo's Pietà
 List of statues of Jesus
 List of works by Michelangelo
 List of Vatican City-related articles

References

Further reading
 Pope-Hennessy, John (1996). Italian High Renaissance and Baroque Sculpture. London: Phaidon
 Hibbard, Howard. 1974. Michelangelo. New York: Harper & Row.
 Matthew 13:55–56 Passage Lookup – New International Version BibleGateway.com
 Wallace, William E. (2009). Michelangelo; the Artist, the Man, and his Times. Cambridge: Cambridge University Press.

External links
 
 vatican.va
 10 Facts That You Don't Know About Michelangelo's Pietà
 Robert Hupka's Pietà Picture gallery
 Models of wax and clay used by Michelangelo in making his sculpture and paintings

Sculptures by Michelangelo
Vandalized works of art in Italy
1490s sculptures
Sculptures in Vatican City
St. Peter's Basilica
Marble sculptures
Nude sculptures
Sculptures of the Pietà
1964 New York World's Fair